SS-20 may refer to:

 The NATO reporting name of Soviet nuclear ballistic missile RT-21M Pioneer
 SS-20, a Polish punk band, later renamed Dezerter 
 The Sun Microsystems SPARCstation 20.